This is a list of schools in Torfaen in Wales.

Primary schools

Blaenavon Heritage VC Primary School
Blenheim Road Primary School
Coed Eva Primary School
Croesyceiliog Primary School
Cwmffrwdoer Primary School
Garnteg Primary School
George Street Primary School
Greenmeadow Primary School
Griffithstown Primary School
Henllys Church in Wales Primary School
Llantarnam Community Primary School 
Llanyrafon Primary School
Maendy Primary School
Nant Celyn Primary School
New Inn Primary School
Our Lady of the Angels RC Primary School
Padre Pio RC Primary School
Penygarn Primary School
Ponthir Church in Wales Primary School
Pontnewydd Primary School
St Davids RC Primary School
Woodlands Primary School
Ysgol Bryn Onnen
Ysgol Gymraeg Cwmbran
Ysgol Gyrmraeg Gwynllyw 
Ysgol Panteg

Secondary schools
Abersychan School
Croesyceiliog School
Cwmbran High School
St Alban's RC High School
West Monmouth School
Ysgol Gymraeg Gwynllyw formerly called Ysgol Gyfun Gwynllyw.

(Llantarnam School was closed in 2015 and amalgamated with Fairwater High on the Fairwater site to form Cwmbran High School).

(Trevethin Comprehensive School was closed in 2007.)

Special and Alternative Provision Schools

Crownbridge Special School. Age range 2-19 years old.

 Nant Celyn Primary School - ASD Base attached and Hearing Impairment Base attached. 
Maendy Primary School - Special Resource Base attached.
 Pontnewydd Primary School - Special Resource Base attached.

Abersychan School - ASD Base attached.
Cwmbran High School - Hearing Resource Base and ASD Base attached. 

 Pont Fach Assessment Centre attached to Maendy Primary School.

Torfaen Pupil Referral Unit - Alternative Tuition:
Ty Glyn site, Pontypool and New Inn site, Pontypool

Independent schools
Rougemont School

Post 16 education & and Further Education 

Ysgol Gymraeg Gwynllyw - 6th Form attached (Welsh Medium Education.)
Torfaen Learning Zone, Coleg Gwent - post 16 education and further education.

Adult Education Centres 

 Croesyceiliog Community Education Centre, Cwmbran
 The Power Station, Cwmbran 
 The Settlement, Pontypool Community Education Centre, Pontypool

External links

 - Torfaen Council list of Schools.
    - Torfaen Council alternative provisions.
  - Coleg Gwent website.
 - Torfaen Adult Education Centres.

 
Torfaen